The Mayor's Office of Immigrant Affairs (MOIA) promotes the well-being of immigrant communities in the City of New York. The primary goals are to  enhance the economic, civic, and social integration of immigrant New Yorkers; facilitate access to justice for immigrant New Yorkers; and advocate for continued immigration reforms at all levels of government in order to eliminate inequities that impact New York's immigrant communities.

Immigrant rights organizations in the United States
Immigration to the United States